Anthene amarah, the black-striped hairtail, leaden hairtail or leaden ciliate blue, is a butterfly of the family Lycaenidae. It is found in tropical Africa and Arabia (up to Aqaba). The habitat consists of savanna and occasionally open areas in the forest zone.

The wingspan is 21–26 mm for males and 23–29 mm for females. Adults are on wing year-round, with a peak in summer.

The larvae feed on Acacia species, including and Acacia karroo, Acacia sieberana, and Acacia gerrardii. They are associated with a number of ants, including Crematogaster bequaerti var. saga, Lepisiota affinis, Camponotus, and Myrmicaria species.

References

External links

Butterflies described in 1847
Anthene